Sony Le Plex HD was an Indian English-language pay-TV channel featuring popular and critically acclaimed Hollywood movies. It was launched on 23 August 2016 and it is owned and operated by Sony Pictures Networks and has the broadcast licenses for Sony, Universal Studios, Lionsgate, MGM and Disney films in India.

Zoya Akhtar was the brand ambassador for Sony Le Plex at the launch time.

Sony Le Plex HD was discontinued by Sony Pictures Networks India on 31 December 2018 at 00:00 hours.

See also
 List of Indian television stations

References

External links
Official Website

Television stations in Mumbai
Television channels and stations established in 2016 
Television channels and stations disestablished in 2018
Sony Pictures Networks India
Defunct television channels in India